The Kreutzer Sonata is a 1987 Soviet drama film directed by Mikhail Shveytser, based on Leo Tolstoy's 1889 novella The Kreutzer Sonata.

Cast
 Oleg Yankovsky as  Poznyshev
 Aleksandr Trofimov as The Fellow Passenger
 Irina Seleznyova as Liza
 Dmitriy Pokrovsky as Trukhachevsky
 Alla Demidova as The Lady
 Lidiya Fedoseyeva-Shukshina	as Liza's mother
 Aleksandr Kalyagin as passenger
 Mikhail Gluzsky	 as passenger
 Olga Tokareva	 as 	Liza's sister
 Nina Agapova as Leocadia Petrovna
 Yuri Volyntsev as  gentleman in public places

References

External links

1987 films
Soviet drama films
Mosfilm films
Films based on The Kreutzer Sonata
Films directed by Mikhail Shveytser